Manuel Alejandro Vela Garrido (born 28 March 1984) is a Mexican former professional footballer.

Career
He made his debut on 14 August 2004, for Chivas against Atlante. He played for fellow Liga MX team Chipas from 2006 to 2008 before moving to Cruz Azul where he would enjoy the most personal and club success, scoring 30 goals across all competitions and appearing the FIFA Club World Cup, the CONCACAF Champions League and the Copa Libertadores. Between 2015 and 2017 he moved between several clubs including Minnesota United of the North American Soccer League. In 2017 he signed with Mexican second division club Venados and played with them until his retirement in July 2020.

Personal life
His younger brother, Carlos Vela, is also a professional footballer who currently plays for Los Angeles FC in Major League Soccer, and previously for Real Sociedad and Arsenal.

References

1984 births
Living people
People from Cancún
Footballers from Quintana Roo
C.D. Guadalajara footballers
Chiapas F.C. footballers
Cruz Azul footballers
Minnesota United FC (2010–2016) players
North American Soccer League players
Association football wingers
Mexican footballers